The Royal Diaries is a series of 20 books published by Scholastic Press from 1999 to 2005. In each of the books, a fictional diary of a real female figure of royalty as a child throughout world history was written by the author. The Royal Diaries was a spin-off of Scholastic's popular Dear America series. While Dear America, My Name Is America, and My America were all cancelled in 2004, The Royal Diaries continued until 2005.

Unlike Dear America, which consisted of diaries of young girls living during pivotal periods in American history, The Royal Diaries  is a series that features women of royalty from all over the world.  The series is fictional, though it involves real historical figures.  Facts and images concerning the historical figure featured in the book are given at the end of each of the books.

Subjects in The Royal Diaries
The Royal Diaries has covered many famous women in royalty, including Jahanara, Marie Antoinette, Eleanor of Aquitaine, Queen Elizabeth I, Mary, Queen of Scots, Isabella I of Castile, Cleopatra VII, the Grand Duchess Anastasia Nikolaevna, Catherine the Great, Empress Elisabeth, and Queen Victoria.  The series has also covered less known women, such as Anacaona of the Taínos, Weetamoo of the Pocassets, the Lady of Ch'iao Kuo of the Hsien, the Lady of Palenque of the Mayans, and Nzingha of Ndongo. It also covers the life and customs of these women. The target age for these books is nine to twelve.

Books in the series
Elizabeth I: Red Rose of the House of Tudor, England, 1544 by Kathryn Lasky (1999)
Cleopatra VII: Daughter of the Nile, Egypt, 57 B.C. by Kristiana Gregory (1999)
Isabel: Jewel of Castilla, Spain, 1466 by Carolyn Meyer (2000)
Marie Antoinette: Princess of Versailles, Austria-France 1769 by Kathryn Lasky (2000)
Anastasia: The Last Grand Duchess, Russia, 1914 by Carolyn Meyer (2000)
Nzingha: Warrior Queen of Matamba, Angola, Africa, 1595 by Patricia McKissack (2000)
Kaiulani: The People's Princess, Hawaii, 1889 by Ellen Emerson White (2001)
Lady of Ch'iao Kuo: Warrior of the South, Southern China, 531 A.D. by Laurence Yep (2001)
Victoria: May Blossom of Britannia, England, 1829 by Anna Kirwan (2001)
Mary, Queen of Scots: Queen Without a Country, France, 1553 by Kathryn Lasky (2002)
Sŏndŏk: Princess of the Moon and Stars, Korea, 595 A.D. by Sheri Holman (2002)
Jahanara: Princess of Princesses, India, 1627 by Kathryn Lasky (2002)
Eleanor: Crown Jewel of Aquitaine, France, 1136 by Kristiana Gregory (2002)
Elisabeth: The Princess Bride, Austria-Hungary, 1853 by Barry Denenberg (2003)
Kristina: The Girl King, Sweden, 1638 by Carolyn Meyer (2003)
Weetamoo: Heart of the Pocassets, Massachusetts-Rhode Island, 1653 by Patricia Clark Smith (2003)
Lady of Palenque: Flower of Bacal, Mesoamerica, A.D. 749 by Anna Kirwan (2004)
Kazunomiya: Prisoner of Heaven, Japan, 1858 by Kathryn Lasky (2004)
Anacaona: Golden Flower, Haiti, 1490 by Edwidge Danticat (2005)
Catherine: The Great Journey, Russia, 1743 by Kristiana Gregory (2005)

TV films
In 2000, HBO created three TV films based on three of the Royal Diaries books: Elizabeth I: Red Rose of the House of Tudor (England, 1544), Isabel: Jewel of Castilla (Spain, 1466), and Cleopatra: Daughter of the Nile (Egypt, 57 BC). The title characters were portrayed by Tamara Hope, Lisa Jakub and Elisa Moolecherry, respectively.

Reruns of these adaptations also aired on Qubo.

TV series
In November 2021, it was reported that Legendary Television and Scholastic Entertainment were developing a television series adaptation.

See also
Dear America
My America

External links
The Royal Diaries at scholastic.ca

References

Series of children's books
Young adult novel series
Children's historical novels
American historical novels
American children's novels
Fictional diaries
Monarchy in fiction